Lindsay Davenport was the defending champion but lost in the semifinals to Venus Williams.

Williams won in the final 6–3, 6–2 against Joannette Kruger.

Seeds
A champion seed is indicated in bold text while text in italics indicates the round in which that seed was eliminated. The top two seeds received a bye to the second round.

  Lindsay Davenport (semifinals)
  Sandrine Testud (quarterfinals)
  Venus Williams (champion)
  Joannette Kruger (final)
  Serena Williams (quarterfinals)
  Amy Frazier (second round)
  Sarah Pitkowski (semifinals)
  Fang Li (first round)

Draw

Final

Section 1

Section 2

External links
 1998 IGA Classic draw

U.S. National Indoor Championships
1998 WTA Tour